Gesneria exserta is a species of plant in the family Gesneriaceae. It is endemic to Jamaica.

References

exserta
Endemic flora of Jamaica
Least concern plants
Taxonomy articles created by Polbot
Taxa named by Olof Swartz